The following highways are numbered 711:

Costa Rica
 National Route 711

Ireland
 R711 regional road

United States